Tankaman-e Jonubi Rural District is in Tankaman District of Nazarabad County, Alborz province, Iran. At the time of the 2006 census, this region and that of Tankaman-e Shomali Rural District before their creation were a part of Tankaman Rural District (then in Tehran province), whose total population was 16,310. At the most recent census of 2016, Tankaman-e Jonubi had a population of 3,279 people in 1,039 households. The largest of its 22 villages was Mohammadabad, with 781 people.

References 

Nazarabad County

Rural Districts of Alborz Province

Populated places in Alborz Province

Populated places in Nazarabad County

fa:دهستان تنکمان جنوبی